The Battle of Yongmunsan (Korean: 용문산 전투, Chinese: 龍門山 戰鬪), was a battle of the Korean War. It was fought between elements of the South Korean 6th Infantry Division and elements of the Chinese 63rd Corps between May 17, 1951, to May 21, 1951.

Background

References

Yongmunsan
Yongmunsan
Yongmunsan
History of Gyeonggi Province